Maurice-Augustin Gomont (born 1839, in Rouen - died 1909, in Rouen) was a French phycologist.

Works
 Gomont, M (1892). "Monographie des Oscillariées (Nostocacées Homocystées). Deuxième partie. - Lyngbyées". Annales des Sciences Naturelles, Botanique. 7 (16).

Honours
 Gomontia, which is a genus of green algae, in the family Gomontiaceae and also Gomontiellaceae, which is a family of cyanobacteria, were both named in 1888 by botanists Jean-Baptiste Édouard Bornet and Charles Henri Marie Flahault after Maurice Gomont.
 Gomontiellaceae are a family of cyanobacteria, with Gomontiella, a species named in 1901.

References

1839 births
1909 deaths
Scientists from Rouen
French phycologists